The Happy Hooker: My Own Story is a best-selling memoir by Xaviera Hollander, a call girl, published in 1971. It sold over 20 million copies. Robin Moore, who took Hollander's dictations of the book's contents, came up with the title, while Yvonne Dunleavy ghostwrote it. In an interview published in 2019, Hollander said Dunleavy "was the one who wrote the book. They taped me, simply asking questions about my life and had the chapters spewed out in about three months. She wrote it, he edited it. He tried in vain to write a chapter, it was a piece of shit".

Adaptations 
Hollander's book inspired a series of movies, starting with The Happy Hooker (1975), which starred Lynn Redgrave. The film was followed by two sequels: The Happy Hooker Goes to Washington (1977) and The Happy Hooker Goes Hollywood (1980). In the sequels the role of Hollander was played by Joey Heatherton and Martine Beswick respectively.

References 

1971 non-fiction books
Autobiographies
Non-fiction books about American prostitution
Memoirs adapted into films
Sex positivism